Borgund is a former municipality in Sogn og Fjordane county, Norway.  It is located in the southeastern part of the traditional district of Sogn. The  municipality existed from 1864 until its dissolution in 1964.  It encompassed an area in the eastern part of the present-day Lærdal Municipality. The administrative center of Borgund was the village of Steinklepp, just northeast of the village of Borgund.  Steinklepp was the site of a store, a bank, and a school.  The historical Filefjell Kongevegen road passes through the Borgund area.

Name
The municipality (originally the parish) was named after the old Borgund farm, where the historic Borgund Stave Church is located.  The name is derived from the old word Borg meaning "fortress" or "stronghold".

Location
The former municipality of Borgund is situated near the southeastern end of the Sognefjorden, along the Lærdalselvi river. The lower parts of the municipality were farms such as Sjurhaugen and Nedrehegg. The lakes Eldrevatnet, Juklevatnet, and Øljusjøen are also located near the border with Hemsedal.

History
Borgund was established as a municipality in 1864 when it was separated from the municipality of Lærdal. Initially it had a population of 963. During the 1960s, there were many municipal mergers across Norway due to the work of the Schei Committee. On 1 January 1964, the municipality of Borgund (population: 492) was merged with the Muggeteigen area (population: 11) of the neighboring Årdal Municipality and all of Lærdal Municipality (population: 1,755) were all merged to form a new, larger municipality of Lærdal.

Government

Municipal council
The municipal council  of Borgund was made up of 13 representatives that were elected to four year terms.  The party breakdown of the final municipal council was as follows:

See also
List of former municipalities of Norway

References

External links

Weather information for Borgund 

Lærdal
Former municipalities of Norway
1864 establishments in Norway
1964 disestablishments in Norway